is a Japanese manga series written by Jinsei Kataoka and illustrated by Kazuma Kondou, who also wrote and illustrated the Eureka Seven manga, and published in Shōnen Ace since 2008. Tokyopop acquired the licensing rights to distribute the manga in English and released the first 5 volumes of the manga before the company shut down its North American Publishing division in 2011. Viz Media announced that it had licensed the series for English language release in North America on July 7, 2013, and released the first volume on February 11, 2014; new volumes were released every two months thereafter.

An anime adaptation aired between April and July 2011, pulling content from the first 21 chapters of the manga. The anime is licensed by Funimation and aired on Adult Swim's newly revived Toonami programming block between May and August 2012.

Plot

A massive anomaly caused a great earthquake that ravaged Japan's mainland and destroyed most of Tokyo, sinking three-quarters of the city into the Pacific Ocean.

Ten years later, the story shifts to Ganta Igarashi, a seemingly ordinary 9th grader attending Nagano Prefecture's middle school. As an escapee, a survivor of the great earthquake, Ganta has no memories of the tragedy and has lived a normal life. This all changes when a strange person covered in blood and crimson armor floats through his classroom windows. Grinning madly, the "Red Man" massacres Ganta's entire class. Instead of killing him, the "Red Man" embeds a red crystal shard in Ganta's chest. Within days of the massacre, Ganta is placed on trial as a suspect. Due to the evidence rigged against him, he is sentenced to death at Deadman Wonderland, a prison that doubles as a theme park and is run by the warden Tsunenaga Tamaki (who posed as Ganta's lawyer and was secretly responsible for the rigged evidence against him).

Arriving at the prison, Ganta is fitted with a special collar which monitors his location and vital signs. A lethal poison is constantly injected into his bloodstream through the collar, but it can be neutralized by consuming a peculiar candy-like medicine every three days, which can be acquired through various activities in the prison, e.g. performing for audiences, working backstage and purchasing with Cast Points (a form of currency among inmates at Deadman Wonderland). To gather Cast Points, an inmate must perform in the facility's lethal games and survive. Fortunately for Ganta, he is aided by a mysterious albino girl named Shiro who apparently knows Ganta, and Minatsuki Takami, who is imprisoned for murdering people because her mother chose to save her flowers instead of her.

While trying to survive as an inmate on death row, Ganta intends to find the "Red Man" to clear his name. In a bizarre twist, Ganta begins to develop the ability to manipulate his own blood, to the point of turning it into a weapon. Unknown to Ganta, he has become one of the prison's "Deadmen," an isolated group of prisoners possessing the Branches of Sin which is an ability which makes them capable of controlling their blood for their own uses. After his ability is discovered, Ganta is forced to participate in brutal gladiatorial death matches known as Carnival Corpse, whose anonymous spectators pay large amounts of money to watch. In his long struggle to survive, he manages to befriend some of those he fought off in the arena and with their help, Ganta continues his quest to uncover the identity of the 'Red Man', why he turned into a Deadman, and the dark secrets the prison authorities are hiding.

About Deadman Wonderland
Deadman Wonderland is Japan's only privately operated prison, built after the Great Tokyo Earthquake on ground zero. Deadman Wonderland was founded by Rinichirō Hagire and run by Tsunenaga Tamaki. It gathers prisoners from all over Japan and raises money for the revival of the destroyed metropolis. To the public and the tourists that visit daily, Deadman Wonderland is a massive theme park-like facility run by the prison population. Unbeknownst to the general population, most of the prison's attractions involve cruel games of survival where many inmates lose their lives or are maimed for the entertainment of an oblivious public. The prison guards are also granted autonomy over how to punish the prisoners, which often results in bloodshed.

Each prisoner is fitted with a collar that functions as a life monitor, locator, and stunner. The prisoners on death row receive poison injections through their special collar and must consume a special antidote candy every three days. Their collars contain countdown timers that warn the wearer with blinking and beeping when time is running low. When the timer reaches zero, the collar displays the word "DEAD" and the inmate immediately succumbs to the poison and dies. Afterwards, the collar unlocks allowing it to be removed. The collars can also be removed by key cards used by the prison guards.

While the threat of violence is constant at the prison, most prisoners enjoy a great deal of liberty inside Deadman Wonderland. Utilizing Cast Points, the prison's unique form of currency, prisoners can purchase a wide variety of items from ordinary lunches, luxurious furniture for their rooms, and even years off of their sentences. However, Cast Points can't be used to buy the freedom of a Deadman. Those on death row also use Cast Points to purchase their life-saving candies.

Despite its identity as a prison and theme park, Deadman Wonderland houses a much darker secret. Hidden away from the eyes of tourists and the general prison population is a massive underground facility known as "G Block". This is where the prison keeps their Deadmen secluded and where the Carnival Corpse arena is located. G Block also houses numerous laboratories and rooms where experiments on humans are performed and where scientists are attempting to harness the powers of the Deadmen for monetary and political gain.

Eventually, Ganta and his Deadman allies received the assistance of Makina, the chief of the prison guards, to defeat Tsunenaga Tamaki. Rinichirō Hagire in Toto Sakagami's body assumed control of Deadman Wonderland while Tamaki committed suicide. After Deadman Wonderland was closed, the necklaces were removed from the inmates. Most of the remaining inmates were transferred to different prisons where some of them were allowed a retrial.

Makina later rallies the Deadmen on a mission to infiltrate Deadman Wonderland and activate the Mother Goose Program to completely seal the Wretched Egg (another name for the Red Man), with the resulting battle destroying most of Deadman Wonderland.

Carnival Corpse
Deadman Wonderland runs a secret gladiator-like game called the Carnival Corpse (also referred to as the Carnival of Corpses), where wealthy anonymous donors pay to watch death-matches between the prison's Deadmen. The viewers of the Carnival Corpse also place their bets on who would win. The winner is awarded a large number of Cast Points, life-saving candies, and other prizes.

Deadmen who are defeated yet survive the game have a part of their anatomy surgically removed for scientific research which is broadcast as part of the Corpse Carnival Post-Game Show. In a cruel twist, the doctor spins a bird-shaped macabre slot machine to determine which part of the loser's body will be removed (with the show being broadcast live to the other prisoners) by the doctor with the parts ranging from the eye (the right one was removed from Senji), vocal cords (which were removed from Nagi), and the kidney, part of the stomach, and hair (which were removed from Minatsuki). Other parts listed on the slot machine are hand, tongue, lip, nose, leg, tooth, nail, heart, lungs, and brain.

When Tamaki unveiled the Forgeries in the Carnival Corpse, the arena was wrecked by a powerful attack from Ganta during a match between the Deadmen and the Forgeries.

Media

Manga

Anime
On July 30, 2009, a retailers' solicitation sheet reported that an anime adaptation had been green-lit. It is animated by Manglobe and aired in Japan from April 17 to July 3, 2011. An original video animation episode was released on October 8, 2011, alongside the eleventh manga volume. The opening theme is "One Reason" by DWB feat. Fade and the ending theme is "Shiny Shiny" by Nirgilis. The series is licensed by Funimation Entertainment and is now available on DVD and Blu-ray. The anime was broadcast on the revived Toonami block from May 27 to August 12, 2012. The anime aired in North America on the Funimation Channel on December 1, 2012.

Music
Two pieces of theme music are used for the episodes: one opening theme and one ending theme. The opening theme is "One Reason" by Deadman Wonder Band (DWB) feat. Fade, while the ending is "Shiny Shiny" by DWB feat. NIRGILIS. The two themes are used in all 13 episodes. Certain characters also have their own image songs: Ganta, Shiro, Genkaku and Minatsuki all have songs; these songs are created by DWB and NIRGILIS, with each character's voice actor serving as vocalist.

China ban
On June 12, 2015, the Chinese Ministry of Culture listed Deadman Wonderland among 38 anime and manga titles banned in China.

Legacy
Shiro's costume is featured in the video game Lollipop Chainsaw. It can be unlocked during gameplay, by using the coins at the closet menu.

References

External links

 

2007 manga
2011 anime OVAs
2011 anime television series debuts
2010s prison television series
Action anime and manga
Animated television series about children
Anime series based on manga
Battle royale anime and manga
Censored television series
Fiction about death games
Dystopian anime and manga
Funimation
Kadokawa Shoten manga
Kadokawa Dwango franchises
Manglobe
Prisons in anime and manga
Shōnen manga
Thriller anime and manga
Tokyopop titles
Toonami
Viz Media manga
Works banned in China